Trowell railway station served the village of Trowell, Nottinghamshire, England from 1884 to 1967 on the Erewash Valley Line.

History 
The station opened on 2 June 1884 by the Midland Railway. The booking hall was positioned on the bridge on the main road between Ilkeston and Nottingham. 

On 16 November 1938 Ernest Lawler broke into the station and stole the safe. He was imprisoned for 6 months. 

It closed to both passengers and goods traffic on 2 January 1967.

Stationmasters
George Smith 1884 (temporary)
John Norton 1884 - 1916 (formerly stationmaster at Water Orton)
Arthur Billington ???? - 1936
Harold Doxey 1936 - 1943 (afterwards stationmaster at Great Barr)
S Barratt 1943 - ????
Neville J. Berry 1961 - ????

References

External links 

Disused railway stations in Nottinghamshire
Railway stations in Great Britain opened in 1884
Railway stations in Great Britain closed in 1967
1884 establishments in England
1967 disestablishments in England
Former Midland Railway stations
Beeching closures in England